Good Morning World is an American sitcom broadcast on CBS-TV during the 1967–1968 season, originally sponsored by Procter & Gamble on Tuesday nights at 9:30pm ET. On January 7, 2017, reruns of the show began airing on the Antenna TV network.

Synopsis

Good Morning World starred Joby Baker and Ronnie Schell as Dave Lewis and Larry Clarke, morning drive time disc jockeys and hosts of the eponymous "Lewis and Clarke Show" on a small AM radio station in Los Angeles. The two host the show under the supervision of station manager Roland B. Hutton Jr., portrayed by Billy De Wolfe in his usual character. Frequently appearing in the subplots was Julie Parrish as Lewis's wife Linda, as well as her aggressive best friend Sandy Kramer, played by  Goldie Hawn in her first professional role.

The series was created and produced by Carl Reiner, Sheldon Leonard, Bill Persky, and Sam Denoff, all of whom were creatively responsible for the critically acclaimed and commercially successful The Dick Van Dyke Show (1961–66) and was inspired by Persky and Denoff's personal experiences working as continuity writers for several disc jockeys on radio station WNEW in New York during the 1950s. In fact, William B. Williams, one of the station's most popular deejays, received screen credit for originating the show's title, which was adapted from his famous opening greeting, "Hello, World!".

Good Morning World was filmed before a live studio audience. Los Angeles Dodgers broadcaster Vin Scully did voice-over narration in some of the episodes.

Ronnie Schell, on the DVD commentary for the series, claimed that the show had been on the bubble for a second season renewal on CBS, but the network was also not entirely satisfied with the main cast, either Baker or Parrish, who was having health concerns that slowed down her performance as the season progressed. Recasting both actors was considered, but CBS, unimpressed with the program losing audience from its lead-in The Red Skelton Show, canceled the show instead. After the show's cancellation after a single season, Schell returned to his previous role on Gomer Pyle, USMC, while Hawn joined the cast of Rowan & Martin's Laugh-In in what would prove to be her breakout role. De Wolfe joined the cast of The Doris Day Show on a recurring basis.

Cast

Ronnie Schell as Larry Clarke
Joby Baker as Dave Lewis
Billy De Wolfe as Roland Hutton, Jr.
Julie Parrish as Linda Lewis
Goldie Hawn as Sandy Kramer

Episode list

Home media
On January 17, 2006, all 26 episodes of Good Morning, World were released on DVD by S'more Entertainment.

Roku has the entire series available for free.

References

External links

CBS original programming
Television series about radio
Television shows set in Los Angeles
1960s American sitcoms
1960s American workplace comedy television series
1967 American television series debuts
1968 American television series endings